The 1974 Cal Poly Mustangs football team represented California Polytechnic State University, San Luis Obispo as a member of the California Collegiate Athletic Association (CCAA) during the 1974 NCAA Division II football season. Led by seventh-year head coach Joe Harper, Cal Poly compiled an overall record of 5–4–1 with a mark of 2–1–1 in conference play, placing second in the CCAA. The Mustangs played home games at Mustang Stadium in San Luis Obispo, California.

Schedule

Team players in the NFL
No Cal Poly Mustang players were selected in the 1975 NFL Draft.

The following finished their college career in 1974, were not drafted, but played in the NFL.

References

Cal Poly
Cal Poly Mustangs football seasons
Cal Poly Mustangs football